Don Opel Arboretum is an arboretum located on the  campus of Highland Community College, 2998 West Pearl City Road, Freeport, Illinois.

See also 
 List of botanical gardens in the United States

External links
 Article about the Don Opel Arboretum - Journal Standard.com, September 11, 2010

Arboreta in Illinois
Botanical gardens in Illinois
Freeport, Illinois
Tourist attractions in Stephenson County, Illinois